The chained ctenotus (Ctenotus halysis)  is a species of skink found in Western Australia.

References

halysis
Reptiles described in 2009
Taxa named by Paul Horner (herpetologist)